The Piano Sonata in F minor  625 is a piano sonata written in September 1818  by Franz Schubert. The Adagio D. 505 is assumed to be its slow movement.

Movements
I. Allegro

F minor. Fragment (ends after the development on the dominant of B-flat minor)

The entire movement revolves around the rhythm of the first bars, and there is an extensive use of trills, an element which forms part of the initial motive. The second subject could be described as being "a consolatory version of the first." As is the case with other Schubert sonatas, the composer left the movement unfinished, breaking off at the beginning of the recapitulation after a substantial development section that modulates extensively. The movement has been completed by Paul Badura-Skoda, who recorded the sonata using his completed version, which was also used by Hanae Nakajima in her complete recording of the sonatas. Martino Tirimo has likewise completed this movement in his edition of the complete piano sonatas, and recorded it. Some pianists, however, such as András Schiff, have recorded the movement as Schubert left it, simply stopping where the manuscript ends.

II. Adagio, D. 505 

D-flat major

The adagio D. 505 is listed as the second movement of the sonata in a catalog of Schubert compositions (with incipits) put together by his brother.

III. Scherzo: Allegretto - Trio

E major

Misha Donat describes the movement as one "whose very distant key and full-blooded sonority following the much leaner texture of the first movement comes as a severe shock."

IV. Allegro

F minor. Fragment (The left hand is missing from measure 201 to measure 270). Ends in F major.

The choice of key and the turbulent writing, unusual for Schubert, indicate an affinity and influence from Beethoven's "Appassionata" Sonata, Op. 57. While Schubert left only a completed sketch of this movement, the soprano line allows the harmony to be easily reconstructed.

Notes

References
 Tirimo, Martino. Schubert: The Complete Piano Sonatas. Vienna: Wiener Urtext Edition, 1997.

Piano sonatas by Franz Schubert
1818 compositions
Compositions in F minor